Joe Dassin (commonly called Elle était… Oh ! after the first track on side 2) is the fifth French studio album by Joe Dassin. It came out in 1971 on CBS Disques.

Commercial performance 
The album reached at least the top 3 in Wallonia (French-speaking Belgium) and the top 10 in France (according to the charts, courtesy respectively of Telemoustique and of Centre d'Information et de Documentation du Disque, U.S. Billboard published in its "Hits of the World" section).

According to a survey published by U.S. Billboard in its 8 July 1972 issue and based on the charts compiled by Centre d'Information et de Documentation du Disque, Joe Dassin was the top album artist of 1971 in France.

Track listing

References

External links 
 

1971 albums
Joe Dassin albums
CBS Disques albums

Albums produced by Jacques Plait